Shopbell & Company was an American architectural firm located in Evansville, Indiana, in the United States.

History

The firm was founded as Harris & Shopbell in 1897 and still had that name in 1905. The firm later became Clifford Shopbell & Co. (ca 1910), and later still (ca 1916 - 1925) Shopbell, Fowler & Thole. The partners designed buildings during the 1910s and 1920s, mainly in Evansville, but also elsewhere in Indiana and Kentucky.  Many of its works survive and are listed on the U.S. National Register of Historic Places.

Evansville, Indiana, historic preservation staff described Clifford Shopbell and Company as "probably the most prominent--or at least the most active" local architectural firm in Evansville's Downtown.  They credit several of its works as showing "clear understanding of program and ceremonial demands", note the firm's use of Prairie School design, and commend it for "one creditable Sullivanesque essay," (the Fellwock Auto Company Building). They also note the Indiana Bank and the Masonic Temple in Classical Revival mode, "along with one or two Chicago School buildings".

In 1919, Clifford Shopbell & Co. built the Evansville Municipal Market.

By 1905, Harris & Shopbell had already built 9 Carnegie libraries: Shelbyville, Greensburg, Franklin, Seymour, Salem,
Princeton, Alt. Vernon and Poseyville, IN, and Henderson, KY; as Clifford Shopbell, the firm went on to build several more. Illinois preservation staff record that Shopbell also built the Illinois libraries at Carmi in 1914, Grayville in 1913, and Marion in 1916. Illinois preservation staff called Clifford Shopbell "the dominant architect of Carnegie libraries in Indiana, with at least fifteen of that state's commissions". The preservation staff state frankly that:

"Like many architects who sought Carnegie Library commissions, Shopbell welcomed publicity. When the Clarion-News of Princeton, Indiana, interviewed him in 1903, Shopbell mentioned that he was currently building four Carnegie libraries, and said that although smaller libraries were usually constructed of pressed brick, since his firm had "an inside price on stone", if Princeton acted quickly, they too could afford a stone library. The firm of Harris and Shopbell was selected and Princeton built a stone library. As the Illinois libraries built by Shopbell are all of brick, his inside price on stone must not have lasted into the 1910s."

Principal partners

The founding partners were Clifford Shopbell and William J. Harris.

Harris was the senior partner; he was born in Louisville, KY, graduating from the high school there in 1887. After an "apprenticeship" in architecture, Harris opened an office in Evansville in 1895, and formed a partnership with Shopbell in 1897. He was a member of the Freemasons, the Knights of Pythias, and the Elks. He married Bell Hawley in 1894.

Shopbell was born in Princeton, IN, on December 8, 1871. From 1889, Shopbell spent five years in the Indianapolis office of architect W. Scott Moore. In 1894 he moved to Evansville, working with architect C. A. Brehmer. In 1897 he married Winifred Dunlap of Indianapolis, and joined Harris to form their architectural partnership. Shopbell was a member of the Freemasons, as well as belonging to the Shriners and the Knights of Pythias. Shopbell died in 1939.

Properties constructed 

Works include (with attribution):

Bibliography

 "NRHP:" 
 William J. Harris and Clifford Shopbell. Harris & Shopbell architects, Evansville, Indiana. Harris & Shopbell (publisher), 1908. (Pictures of buildings).

References

External links
 Historic Photograph of Clifford Shopbell & Co, 1919 Willard Library, Indiana.

Architecture firms based in Indiana
Evansville, Indiana